The Phoenix Team was a Canadian television drama series which aired on CBC Television in 1980.

Plot
David Brook (Don Francks), a Canadian spy during the Cold War, teams up with former British secret service agent Valerie Koester (Elizabeth Shepherd) and return to the espionage business. Brook and Koester are also former lovers. Other characters include General (Mavor Moore), the Canadian secret service chief, and Graydon (Brian Linehan), the spies' manager, Carvallo (Steve Pernie), Janev (Lee Broker), Moffat (Gerry Crack), Theo (Arnie Achtman) and Miss Woods (Amelia Hall).

Scheduling
Hour-long episodes were broadcast on Tuesdays at 10:00 p.m. from 16 September to 28 October 1980.

Episodes

 "Old Times' Sake" (part 1, part 2) – John Trent director
 "Like Father, Like Son"
 "Sanctuary"
 "Saving Grace"
 "The Judas Game"
 "Close Shave"
 "The Fourth Man"

References

External links
 
 

CBC Television original programming
1980 Canadian television series debuts
1980 Canadian television series endings
Espionage television series
1980s Canadian drama television series